The Tolowa language (also called Chetco-Tolowa, or Siletz Dee-ni) is a member of the Pacific Coast subgroup of the Athabaskan language family. Together with three other closely related languages (Lower Rogue River Athabaskan, Upper Rogue River Athabaskan or Galice-Applegate and Upper Umpqua or Etnemitane) it forms a distinctive Oregon Athabaskan cluster within the subgroup.

Geographic distribution 
At the time of first European contact Tolowa was spoken in several large and prosperous village communities along the Del Norte County coast in the far northwestern corner of California and along the southern coast of adjacent Curry County, Oregon. Today the term Tolowa (or sometimes Smith River) is used primarily by those residing in California, most of whom are affiliated with Tolowa Dee-ni' Nation. Those residing in Oregon, most of whom are affiliated with the Confederated Tribes of Siletz southwest of Portland, where their ancestors were removed in the 1850s (Beckham 1971), refer to themselves as Chetco, Tututni, or Deeni.

For details of the linguistic documentation of Chetco-Tolowa and a survey of Oregon Athabaskan phonology and grammar, see Golla (2011:70-75).

Phonology 

As with many Athabaskan languages, Tolowa features contrasting aspirated, unaspirated, and ejective stops, as well as contrasting vowel length and nasality.  Tolowa is not fully tonal, but instead has a pitch accent.  This is typical of the Pacific Coast Athabaskan languages.

Consonants 

/ɬ/ is affricated to  after vowels.  /j/ is realized as  after nasal vowels.

Vowels 

Tolowa vowels have some degree of allophonicity.  /u/ and /o/ are in free variation;  is an allophone of /a/ after palatals and velars; /ə/ is raised to  near palatals and to  before velars, and is nasalized ([ə̃]) before nasal consonants.  In addition, Tolowa has three diphthongs: [ai], [au], and [ui].

Alphabet 

Syllables are usually separated with an en dash (-) for clarity.  The 1997 Tolowa Dee-niʼ alphabet (below) replaces the special characters ą, į, ɨ, ł, ų, and ʉ with a~, i~, lh, u~ and v, respectively.  Note that the distinction between ɨ and ʉ is lost.

Tolowa language revitalization 
Loren Bommelyn, a fluent speaker and linguist, has published several pedagogical books and teaches young Tolowa students in Crescent City, California.

Three alphabets have been used since the formation of the Tolowa Dee-ni’ Language program, sponsored by the Del Norte Indian Welfare Association in 1969. The first was a "Tolowa version of the Uni-fon alphabet', written by hand. A new Practical Alphabet was devised in 1993 for purposes of typing on the computer. In 1997, Loren Bommelyn developed an alphabet which did not require a barred l or nasal hook characters called the Tolowa Dee-ni’ Alphabet (see previous section).

Siletz Dee-ni language revitalization 
Siletz Dee-ni is a form of Tolowa historically spoken by members of the Confederated Tribes of Siletz Indians on the Siletz Indian Reservation in Oregon. According to a report by the National Geographic Society and the Living Tongues Institute for Endangered Languages, it is the last of many languages spoken on the reservation and was said in 2007 to have only one living speaker. However, the language has since been at least partially revived, and in some areas, ‘many now text each other in Siletz Dee-ni’.

Courses for 6th- through 8th-graders have been offered at Oregon's Siletz Valley Charter School. Alfred "Bud" Lane has gathered 14,000 words of Siletz Dee-ni, a variety of Chetco-Tolowa "restricted to a small area on the central Oregon coast," in an online audio/picture dictionary for the use of the community.

Notes

Bibliography 
 Beckham, Stephen Dow (1971). Requiem for a People: The Rogue River Indians and the Frontiersmen. Norman: University of Oklahoma Press.
 Bommelyn, Loren (1995). Now You're Talking Tolowa. Arcata: Humboldt State University, Center for Indian Community Development.
 Collins, James  (1998). Understanding Tolowa Histories: Western Hegemonies and Native American Responses. London: Routledge
 Golla, Victor (2011). California Indian Languages. Berkeley: University of California Press. .
 Macnaughtan, Don. Oregon Athapaskan Languages: Bibliography of the Athapaskan Languages of Oregon.

External links 
 
 Siletz Tribal Language Project
 Tolowa language, at native-languages.org
Tolowa language overview at the Survey of California and Other Indian Languages
 
Tah-Ah-Dun Indian Magnet Charter School

OLAC resources in and about the Tolowa language
OLAC resources in and about the Chetco language

Pacific Coast Athabaskan languages

Indigenous languages of Oregon
Endangered Athabaskan languages
Native American language revitalization
Languages extinct in the 2000s
2001 disestablishments in Oregon
Indigenous languages of the Pacific Northwest Coast